Coubalan is a small town in the rural district of the same name, located in Tenghory Arrondissement, Bignona Department, Ziguinchor Region, Senegal.

Populated places in the Bignona Department
Arrondissement of Tenghory